Deutsche Bahn and its predecessors Deutsche Bundesbahn, Deutsche Reichsbahn and Deutsche Reichsbahn-Gesellschaft use a system of letters to denote a station on their network. The station code used today is colloquially called the DS 100 code, named after the original papers of the Deutsche Bundesbahn laying out the system, the DS 100, Abkürzungen der Betriebsstellen; nowadays called Richtlinie (Ril) 100, Abkürzungen für Örtlichkeiten. Every code specifies abbreviation, name and type of the station.

Description of the code 
The code is set up as follows:
X YYYY Z
where X denotes the Bundesbahndirektion (BD) in West Germany or Reichsbahndirektion (Rbd) in East Germany and prior to 1949, and YYYY is the code of the station itself, which can be up to four letters. Together with the Direktionen letter (X or Z) the first letter is also the country code for foreign destinations (see below). Although some of the Direktionen have been merged into others, changed, or otherwise remodeled, their old codes remained in place. For example, most of the Northern areas of Germany still have the BD code A for Altona (now a part of Hamburg), even though the BD Altona has long been out of existence.
Further information can be added by an extra letter Z after the station identifier, for example HB is the code for Bremen Hauptbahnhof, (BD Hanover (H), station code B) whilst HB X is the code for the Bremen maintenance works, which are considered a subdivision of Bremen Hauptbahnhof and hence do not have their own code.
Special codes are also used to identify border points, special tariff points for ships et cetera.

Listing of BD/Rbd codes 
 A – Altona (Hamburg)
 B – Berlin
 D – Dresden
 E – Essen
 F – Frankfurt
 H – Hannover
 K – Köln
 L – Halle (Saale)
 M – München
 N – Nürnberg
 R – Karlsruhe
 S – Saarbrücken
 T – Stuttgart
 U – Erfurt
 W – Schwerin
 X – Codes actually assigned for international destinations west of Germany, but used for eastern European destinations too
 Z – Codes actually assigned for international destinations east of Germany

Letters C, G, I, J, O, P, Q, V and Y are assigned for facilities of DB Energie (e.g. filling stations) and DB Netz (e.g. changes of VzG lines) or other foreign locations for planning purposes.

Country codes
 XA – Austria
 XB – Belgium
 XC – Russia
 XD – Denmark
 XE – Spain
 XF – France
 XG – Greece
 XH – Finland
 XI – Italy
 XJ – Serbia
 XK – United Kingdom
 XL – Luxembourg
 XM – Hungary
 XN – Netherlands
 XO – Norway
 XP – Poland
 XQ – Turkey
 XR – Croatia
 XS – Switzerland
 XT – Czech Republic
 XU – Romania
 XV – Sweden
 XW – Bulgaria
 XX – Portugal
 XY – Slovakia
 XZ – Slovenia
 ZA – Macedonia
 ZB – Bosnia and Herzegovina
 ZE – Estonia
 ZI – Ireland
 ZK – Kazakhstan
 ZL – Lithuania
 ZM – Moldova
 ZT – Latvia
 ZU – Ukraine
 ZW – Belarus

Listing of station types

List of station codes 
 Please refer Deutsche Bahn AG: Übersicht der Betriebsstellen und deren Abkürzungen aus der Richtlinie 100 (PDF, 769 KB, status: August 2015)

See also
Railway divisions in Germany
Railway station types in Germany

External links
 List of Deutsche Bahn station codes (additionally with historical stations) on Bahnstatistik.de

References

Deutsche Bahn